Pipes of Peace is the fourth  solo studio album by English singer-songwriter Paul McCartney, released on 31 October 1983. As the follow-up to the popular Tug of War, the album came close to matching the commercial success of its predecessor in Britain but peaked only at number 15 on America's Billboard Top LPs & Tape chart. While Pipes of Peace was the source of international hit singles such as "Say Say Say" (recorded with Michael Jackson) and the title track, the critical response to the album was less favourable than that afforded to Tug of War.

Background and structure
Many of the songs released on Pipes of Peace were recorded during the 1981 sessions for Tug of War, with "Pipes of Peace", "The Other Me", "So Bad", "Tug of Peace" and "Through Our Love" being recorded afterwards, in September–October 1982. Accordingly, the album has many things in common with its predecessor: it was produced by George Martin, it featured two collaborations with the same artist (this time with Michael Jackson; the Tug of War collaborations being with Stevie Wonder), and continued McCartney's alliance in the studio with Ringo Starr, former 10cc guitarist Eric Stewart and his last session work with Wings guitarist Denny Laine. By November, McCartney would start shooting his self-written motion picture Give My Regards to Broad Street, co-starring wife Linda, Starr and Tracey Ullman, which would take up most of his time throughout 1983. Due to the filming commitments (and to allow a reasonable lapse of time between his new album and Tug of War), the release of Pipes of Peace was delayed until October.

Unlike Tug of War, the album features an electro-tinged sound. On the track "Tug of Peace", McCartney blended the title song to Tug of War with that of the new album. Stephen Thomas Erlewine of AllMusic describes the mix as "an almost-electro collage that twists the songs into McCartney II territory".

McCartney spent much of his energies finishing and preparing Give My Regards to Broad Street for release in the autumn of 1984.

Reissues
In 1983 Pipes of Peace made its debut on CD on Columbia Records. In 1993, the album was remastered and reissued on CD as part of The Paul McCartney Collection. Three bonus tracks were included on the latter release: the previously unreleased "Twice in a Lifetime" (the title song of the 1985 film of the same name); his 1984 hit from the Rupert Bear project, "We All Stand Together"; and "Simple as That", released in 1986 on the charity album The Anti-Heroin Project – It's a Live-In World.

The album was reissued in remastered form in 2015 as part of the ongoing Paul McCartney Archive Collection series of releases. The version with "enhanced packaging" contains three discs: the remastered album itself, a bonus audio disc containing mostly demo versions of the songs found on the first disc, and a disc with a film. The reissue was accompanied by the Record Store Day exclusive single "Say Say Say (2015 Remix)".

Reception 

"Say Say Say" was released as the album's lead single in October 1983. A duet with Michael Jackson, it reached number 2 in the UK and number 1 in the US, where it remained for six weeks through to early in 1984. Pipes of Peace peaked at number 4 in the UK and number 15 in the US. Following "Say Say Say", the album's title track became a UK number 1, while in the US, the flipside "So Bad" hit number 23.

Critical reaction was less than that which had greeted Tug of War, many feeling that Pipes of Peace was a weaker execution of its predecessor's formula. In addition, according to McCartney biographer Howard Sounes, the album's commercial reception was "slightly disappointing, considering the quality of the work".

Reviewing the album for the NME, Penny Reel described Pipes of Peace as "A dull, tired and empty collection of quasi-funk and gooey rock arrangements ... with McCartney cooing platitudinous sentiments on a set of lyrics seemingly made up on the spur of the moment." Reel opined that the "one decent moment" was the title track, which he found to be "a Beatlish soiree surely destined as a Christmas single", before concluding: "Even here, however, a note of insincerity in the vocal finally defeats the lyric's objective."

Sounes views Pipes of Peace and its predecessor as "abounding with well-crafted tunes" that almost match the standard of McCartney's work with the Beatles; yet, he adds, the two albums "must be marked down for a surfeit of love ballads with lamentable lyrics". Reviewing the 2015 reissue of Pipes of Peace, for Pitchfork, Ron Hart notes that, at the time of release, "Some critics derided McCartney for aging gracelessly", yet "a good listen to the album today reveals some ways it was ahead of its time." Hart writes of the song "Tug of Peace": "an early, primitive version of a mash-up that brought together the title cuts of these underappreciated albums. The blend is clunky, but it foreshadows his electronic music work as the Fireman and on Liverpool Sound Collage."

By contrast, Jeff Strowe of PopMatters considers that the album "presents McCartney at his most regrettable", and views "Pipes of Peace" and "Tug of Peace" as, respectively, a "woefully underdeveloped title track" and a "dreadful mashup". Strowe writes more favourably of "Say Say Say", however, describing it as "catchy in that pure '80s manner", and highlights "Sweetest Little Show" and "Average Person" as "a nice one-two punch of refreshing creativity that give the proceedings a much needed spark of interest and vitality".

Track listing
All songs written by Paul McCartney, except "Say Say Say" and "The Man" co-written by Michael Jackson, and "Hey Hey" co-written by Stanley Clarke.

Side one
"Pipes of Peace" – 3:56
"Say Say Say" – 3:55
"The Other Me" – 3:58
"Keep Under Cover" – 3:05
"So Bad" – 3:20

Side two
"The Man" – 3:55
"Sweetest Little Show" – 2:54
"Average Person" – 4:33
"Hey Hey" – 2:54
"Tug of Peace" – 2:54
"Through Our Love" – 3:28

Archive Collection Reissue

In 2015 the album was re-issued by Hear Music/Concord Music Group as part of the sixth set of releases, alongside Tug of War, in the Paul McCartney Archive Collection. It was released in multiple formats:

Standard Edition 2-CD; the original 11-track album on the first disc, plus 9 bonus tracks on a second disc.
Deluxe Edition 2CD/1DVD Box Set + 112 page essay book and 64 page behind the scenes book about the music video for the song "Pipes of Peace"
Remastered vinyl The albums are also available on special gatefold vinyl editions (vinyl editions include a download card).

Digital
Standard:
Standard Res – without Ebooklet
Standard Res – with Ebooklet
Mastered for iTunes – without Ebooklet
Hi-Res – 24bit 96 kHz – with Ebooklet –

Deluxe:
Standard Res (with or without Ebooklet)
Mastered for iTunes (with Ebooklet)
Hi-Res – 24bit 96 kHz (with Ebooklet)

Disc 1 – remastered album
All songs written by Paul McCartney, except "Say Say Say" and "The Man" co-written by Michael Jackson, and "Hey Hey" co-written by Stanley Clarke.
The original 11-track album.

Disc 2 – bonus audio
"Average Person"  – 4:05
"Keep Under Cover"  – 3:44
"Sweetest Little Show"  – 3:00
"It's Not On"  – 2:56
"Simple as That"  – 3:16
"Say Say Say"  – 6:59
"Ode to a Koala Bear"  – 3:48
"Twice in a Lifetime" – 3:02
"Christian Bop" – 2:03

Tracks 1-6 and 9 are previously unreleased.

Additional download tracks available via paulmccartney.com
"Say Say Say"  – 3:41

Disc 3 – DVD
"Pipes of Peace" Music Video
"So Bad" Music Video
"Say Say Say" Music Video
"Hey Hey in Montserrat" 
"Behind the Scenes at AIR Studios" 
"The Man"

Personnel 
 Paul McCartney – arrangements, vocals, acoustic piano, keyboards, synthesizers, guitars, bass guitar, drums
 Denny Laine – keyboards, guitars, vocals
 Bill Wolfer – keyboards (2)
 Linda McCartney – keyboards, backing vocals
 Eric Stewart – guitars, backing vocals
 David Williams – guitars (2)
 Hugh Burns – guitars 
 Geoff Whitehorn – guitars
 Nathan Watts – bass guitar (2)
 Stanley Clarke – bass guitar (4, 9), vocals (9)
 Steve Gadd – drums (9)
 Ricky Lawson – drums (2)
 Dave Mattacks – drums (11)
 Ringo Starr – drums (5, 8)
 James Kippen – tabla (1)
 Michael Jackson – percussion (2, 6), vocals (2, 6)
 Chris Hammer Smith – harmonica (2)
 Andy Mackay – saxophones 
 Ernie Watts – saxophones (2)
 Gary Herbig – flute 
 Gary Grant – horns (2)
 Jerry Hey – horns (2)
 Gavyn Wright – violin
 George Martin – arrangements, bicycle wheel, garden canes (10), acoustic piano (11)
 Pestalozzi's Children's Choir – backing vocals (1)

String section
 Kenneth Sillito – orchestra leader
 Adrian Shepherd – conductor (7)
 Kenneth Essex, Patrick Halling, Anthony Harvey, Alexander Kok, Alan J. Peters, Michael Rennie, Galina Solodchin, George Turnlund, John Underwood, Denis Vigay, Peter Willison and Gavyn Wright – string players

Production 
 George Martin – producer 
 Geoff Emerick – engineer 
 Jon Jacobs – assistant engineer 
 Mike Stavrou – assistant engineer
 Alex Wharton – mastering 
 Clive Barker – artwork (chrome sculpture)
 Vincent van Gogh – artwork (chair and pipe)
 YES – creative direction, design 
 Linda McCartney – cover photography

Charts

Weekly charts

Year-end charts

Certifications and sales

References

External links 

 JPGR's Beatles site: Paul McCartney's Pipes of Peace

Paul McCartney albums
1983 albums
Parlophone albums
Albums produced by George Martin
Albums recorded in a home studio